Teemu Riihijärvi (born March 1, 1977) is a Finnish former professional ice hockey forward. He was drafted in the first round, twelfth overall, of the 1995 NHL Entry Draft by the San Jose Sharks. He never appeared in an NHL game.

Career statistics

Regular season and playoffs

International

External links

1977 births
Finnish ice hockey forwards
Living people
San Jose Sharks draft picks
National Hockey League first-round draft picks
Espoo Blues players
Lukko players
Lahti Pelicans players
SaiPa players
Södertälje SK players
Sportspeople from Espoo